Plasmer was a short-lived 1993 comic book series from Marvel UK, created by Glenn Dakin and Pascual Ferry.

Biography
Plasmer was about a shapeshifting, artificial lifeform created by Doctor Oonagh Mullarkey. Dr. Mullarkey used both science and magic to separate the good and evil parts of her personality as a means of increasing her abilities. The good parts of her were placed in a formless protoplasm that developed a life of its own, and became the superhero Plasmer.

Controversy
Plasmer was the subject of a Marvel lawsuit against Defiant Comics' Plasm due to alleged similarities in name.  Defiant changed the name to Warriors of Plasm but went bankrupt soon after due to the legal costs.

Notes

References

Plasmer at the Appendix to the Handbook of the Marvel Universe

Plasmer at the Big Comic Book DataBase

1993 comics debuts
Marvel UK titles